Events from the year 1718 in France.

Incumbents 
Monarch: Louis XV
Regent: Philip II of Orleans

Events
 January – France declares war on Spain, leading to the 2-year War of the Quadruple Alliance.
 May 7 – New Orleans is founded.

 November 18 – Voltaire's first play, Oedipus, premières at the Comédie-Française in Paris. This is his first use of the pseudonym.

Births
 January 29 – Paul Rabaut, Huguenot pastor (d. 1794)
 October 19 – Victor-François, 2nd duc de Broglie, Marshal of France (d. 1804)

Deaths
 February 18 – Pierre Antoine Motteux, French-born English dramatist (b. 1663)
 April 3 – Jacques Ozanam, mathematician (b. 1640)
 April 27 – Jacques Bernard, theologian (b. 1658)
 May 22 – Gaspard Abeille, lyric and tragic poet (b. 1648)
 June 13 – Louis, Count of Armagnac, noble (b. 1641)
 July 28 – Étienne Baluze, scholar (b. 1630)
 September 12 – Louise de Maisonblanche, illegitimate daughter of Louis XIV of France (b. 1676)
 October 19 – Alphonse Henri, Count of Harcourt, noble (b. 1646)

See also

References

1710s in France